Rupes  (plural ) is the Latin word for 'cliff'. It is used in planetary geology to refer to escarpments on other worlds. , the IAU has named 62 such features in the Solar System, on Mercury (17), Venus (7), the Moon (8), Mars (23), the asteroids Vesta (2) and Lutetia (2), and Uranus's satellites Miranda (2) and Titania (1).

How rupes formed is, a matter of speculation. Compressional strain from the cooling of the crust of terrestrial planets and large-scale displacement due to impacts are the two dominant theories.

See also 
 Rupes on the Earth's moon
 Rupes on Mercury
 Rupes on Venus
 Rousillon Rupes
 Rupes Tenuis
 Verona Rupes

References

Planetary geology
Slope landforms